Budanovsky is a rural locality (a khutor) in Starobelitsky Selsoviet Rural Settlement, Konyshyovsky District, Kursk Oblast, Russia. Population:

Geography 
The khutor is located on the Belichka River (a left tributary of the Svapa River), 51 km from the Russia–Ukraine border, 81 km north-west of Kursk, 22.5 km north-west of the district center – the urban-type settlement Konyshyovka, 4 km from the selsoviet center – Staraya Belitsa.

 Climate
Budanovsky has a warm-summer humid continental climate (Dfb in the Köppen climate classification).

Transport 
Budanovsky is located 43 km from the federal route  Ukraine Highway, 50 km from the route  Crimea Highway, 17.5 km from the route  (Trosna – M3 highway), 7 km from the road of regional importance  (Fatezh – Dmitriyev), 19 km from the road  (Konyshyovka – Zhigayevo – 38K-038), 5 km from the road  (Dmitriyev – Beryoza – Menshikovo – Khomutovka), 5.5 km from the road of intermunicipal significance  (38N-144 – Oleshenka with the access road to Naumovka), on the road  (38N-146 – Arbuzovo – Budanovsky), 1 km from the nearest railway station Arbuzovo (railway lines Navlya – Lgov-Kiyevsky and Arbuzovo – Luzhki-Orlovskiye).

The rural locality is situated 86 km from Kursk Vostochny Airport, 182 km from Belgorod International Airport and 285 km from Voronezh Peter the Great Airport.

References

Notes

Sources

Rural localities in Konyshyovsky District